Bring It On! is the debut studio album by Australian alternative rock band Machine Gun Fellatio. It was released in 2000 by record label Mushroom.

Reception 

Jody Macgregor of AllMusic wrote, "there's genuine songcraft to MGF and it's on display in Bring It On! more than anywhere else in their brief discography", and described the song "Unsent Letter" as "[a] bittersweet love song that sits comfortably among the best pop music Australian bands have ever produced".

Track listing 

"Blacklamb" and "Horny Blonde Forty" were originally recorded as Limebunny (a pre-Machine Gun Fellatio band founded by Pinky Beecroft and Chit Chat von Loopin Stab) songs. The recordings of those songs on Bring It On! were taken from the compilation album Unsound Sounds, released in 1997 (the same recording of "Blacklamb" also appears on MGF's debut EP Love Comes to an End).

Charts

References 

2000 debut albums
Machine Gun Fellatio albums